is a railway station located in the city of Semboku, Akita Prefecture, Japan, operated by the third sector railway operator Akita Nairiku Jūkan Railway.

Lines
Kami-Hinokinai Station is served by the Nariku Line, and is located 65.9 km from the terminus of the line at Takanosu Station.

Station layout
The station consists of one island platform with a level crossing. The station is unattended. There is no station building, but only a shelter built on the platform.

Adjacent stations

History
Kami-Hinokinai Station opened on April 1, 1989 serving the village of Nishiki, Akita.

Surrounding area
 
Kamihinokinai Elementary School

External links

 Nairiku Railway Station information 

Railway stations in Japan opened in 1989
Railway stations in Akita Prefecture
Semboku, Akita